The men's sprint cycling event at the 1948 Summer Olympics took place between 7 and 9 August and was one of six events at the 1948 Olympics. There were 23 cyclists from 23 nations, with each nation limited to one competitor. The event was won by Mario Ghella of Italy, the nation's first victory in the men's sprint. Reg Harris of Great Britain, heavily favored coming into the event, finished with silver, the first medal for a British cyclist in the sprint since 1920. Axel Schandorff's bronze was Denmark's first medal in the event since 1928. The podium streaks of the Netherlands (five Games) and France (four Games) both ended, with neither nation's cyclist able to advance to the quarterfinals.

Background

This was the ninth appearance of the event, which has been held at every Summer Olympics except 1904 and 1912. None of the semifinalists from 1936 returned, but Howard Wing of China competed again after the 12-year break occasioned by World War II. The heavy favorite and host nation hero was 1947 World Champion Reg Harris; his biggest rival, Cor Bijster of the Netherlands, had turned professional and could not compete in the Games.

Cuba, Guyana, India, Pakistan, Trinidad and Tobago, Uruguay, and Venezuela each made their debut in the men's sprint. France made its ninth appearance, the only nation to have competed at every appearance of the event.

Competition format

This track cycling event consisted of numerous rounds. Each race involved the riders starting simultaneously and next to each other, from a standing start. Because the early part of races tend to be slow-paced and highly tactical, only the time for the last 200 metres of the race is typically recorded (though the full time for these Games was recorded as well). The distance for the sprint in 1948 was actually 920 metres instead of the standard 1000 metres, to be exactly two laps of the track.

The first two rounds consisted of single races between pairs of cyclists. The berths in the second round were allocated to the winners from each of the races in the first round, and the winners from each race in the repechage round. Starting with the quarterfinals stage, cyclists were paired once again, this time racing against each other two times, with the winner advancing further in the competition. This was the first time that the best-of-three format was used for the quarterfinals and semifinals (having been introduced in 1932 for the final and expanded to the bronze medal match in 1936).

Records

The records for the sprint are 200 metre flying time trial records, kept for the qualifying round in later Games as well as for the finish of races.

* World records were not tracked by the UCI until 1954.

No new Olympic record was set during the competition.

Schedule

All times are British Summer Time (UTC+1)

Results

Round 1

Round 1 heat 1

Rocca won by two lengths.

Round 1 heat 2

Van De Velde won by a wheel. Wing broke his collar bone after the race.

Round 1 heat 3

Roth won by inches.

Round 1 heat 4

Harris won by a length.

Round 1 heat 5

Hijzelendoorn won by half a length.

Round 1 heat 6

Cortoni won by two lengths.

Round 1 heat 7

Schandorff won by a length.

Round 1 heat 8

Bellenger won by two lengths.

Round 1 heat 9

Welt won by half a length.

Round 1 heat 10

Heid won by two lengths.

Round 1 heat 11

Ghella won easily.

Repechage

Howard Wing from China broke his collar bone after finishing his first round race. Manthos Kaloudis from Greece, who had arrived late and missed the first round, took his place.

Repechage heat 1

Lacourse won by two lengths.

Repechage heat 2

Paseiro won by two lengths.

Repechage heat 3

Bazzano won by two lengths.

Repechage heat 4

León won by a length.

Repechage heat 5

Masanés beat replacement rider Kaloudis by two lengths, with Lewis finishing third.

Round 2

The race between Jan Hijzelendoorn from the Netherlands and Leonel Rocca from Uruguay was repeated following a protest from Uruguay after the disqualification of Rocca.

Round 2 heat 1

Ghella won by four lengths.

Round 2 heat 2

There was a crash at the very end of the race, with Hijzelendoorn unable to finish and Rocca disqualified. The Uruguayan team protested the result, however, and the protest was successful. The heat was ordered to be re-run on the next day of competition (two days later). The delay for the appeal led to 40 minutes of inactivity on the track, which the spectators did not appreciate. The result also delayed the start of the later rounds from Saturday to Monday. In the re-run, Rocca won by two lengths.

 Original

 Re-run

Round 2 heat 3

Masanés won by inches.

Round 2 heat 4

Schandorff won easily.

Round 2 heat 5

Van De Velde won by half a wheel.

Round 2 heat 6

Heid won by an inch.

Round 2 heat 7

Bazzano won by one and a half lengths.

Round 2 heat 8

Harris won by a length.

Quarterfinals

Quarterfinal 1

Ghella won the first race by a length and the second by two lengths.

Quarterfinal 2

Schandorff won the first race by a length and the second by two lengths.

Quarterfinal 3

Harris won both races by a length.

Quarterfinal 4

Bazzano won the first race by a wheel and the second by a length and a half.

Semifinals

Semifinal 1

Ghella won the first race by three-quarters of a length and the second by three lengths.

Semifinal 2

Harris won the first race by a length and the second by three-quarters of a length.

Finals

Bronze medal match

Schandorff won the first race by three-quarters of a length and the second by two lengths.

Final

Ghella won the first race by three lengths and the second by one and a half lengths. In the first, Ghella made his attack at the 300-yard mark, passing Harris on the inside (accorded a tactical error to leave space inside by the British cyclist). The final distance between the two was increased by Harris easing off to conserve energy for the second race. Doing so did him little good, however, as in the second race Ghella took the lead and fought off two challenges by Harris in the final two straights.

Final standings

References

External links
Cycling at the 1948 London Summer Games: Men's Sprint, sports-reference.com. Retrieved 18 September 2016.
Organising Committee for the XIV Olympiad, The (1948). The Official Report of the Organising Committee for the XIV Olympiad. LA84 Foundation. Retrieved 4 September 2016.

Cycling at the 1948 Summer Olympics
Cycling at the Summer Olympics – Men's sprint
Track cycling at the 1948 Summer Olympics